Giorgio Sanguinetti is an Italian musicologist, music historian and music theorist. He is best known as the author of The Art of Partimento: History, Theory, and Practice, the first monograph dedicated to the history, theory, and practice of partimento instruction as practiced in the music conservatories of Naples from the end of the 17th century to the middle of the 19th century. Sanguinetti is full professor of theory and analysis of music at the University of Rome Tor Vergata.

Education
Sanguinetti graduated in piano at the Milan Conservatory in 1976 and in music composition at the Conservatorio Statale di Musica "Gioachino Rossini" in 1993. Post-graduation, Sanguinetti studied piano with Vera Gobbi Belcredi, and music composition with Vieri Tosatti in Rome. In 1994, Sanguinetti studied Schenkerian analysis privately with Carl Schachter in New York.

Awards
 Wallace Berry Award (2013) - The Art of Partimento

Books

See also
 Partimento
 Music conservatories of Naples
 Robert Gjerdingen

References

Further reading

External links
 Giorgio Sanguinetti faculty page at the University of Rome-Tor Vergata.
 

Music theorists
Italian music theorists
20th-century Italian musicologists
21st-century musicologists
Year of birth missing (living people)
Living people
Milan Conservatory alumni